Lee Hyeon-sik (born 21 March 1996) is a South Korean footballer who plays as midfielder.

Career
Lee joined K League 1 side Gangwon FC before 2018 season starts.

Club
As of 29 May 2021

References

1996 births
Living people
Association football midfielders
South Korean footballers
Gangwon FC players
K League 1 players